Ori Toledano (born 1985) is an Israeli musical artist and producer known by his stage name "Kayma". His music has been featured in various TV shows and commercials. Ori is the youngest son of Liora Gal and prominent Israeli singer Avi Toledano, who represented Israel at the 1982 Eurovision Song Contest.

Background 
Ori Toledano was born in Tel Aviv, Israel in 1985 to Liora (née Gal) and Avi Toledano. Toledano has two older siblings, Eran and Tal. When he was eight years old, Toledano's parents divorced and he continued to live with his mother. Toledano claims that despite having grown up in a musical household, he was put off from engaging in music at an early age and that it was only in fourth grade, when he picked up a guitar for the first time, that he decided that music was going to be a part of his life. In 2001, at the age of sixteen Toledano moved in to live with his girlfriend on Bugrashov street in Tel Aviv and started to work at a local bar. His mother, Liora, relocated to Chicago and remarried. His father remarried as well and went on to father three more children.

Career 
After serving in the IDF, Toledano relocated to New York City where he worked in real estate. He later moved to Tennessee and Miami, Florida and then to Los Angeles where he lived for four years. During this time, he got married, divorced and opened up a failed business. Before moving back to Israel, Toledano studied at the SAE Institute. Toledano later opened up his own recording studio and was eventually approached by representatives of an Israeli television station for which he started to produce commercial jingles, music and voice-overs. He went on to produce for various big name companies such as Goldstar Beer, Soda Stream, Fiverr and Intel.

Toledano later moved back to Israel and managed the sound department at Ono Academic College.

In 2021, Toledano launched his solo career under the stage name "Kayma". His first solo single, "Onsitelover", was released in May of that year. His second single "Learn to Say No" was released later that year.

Discography 

Singles

 Just Like Me (2013)
 Wishing Girl (2017) (with Gil Landau)
 Joker Up My Sleeve (2018)
 Daffodil Without A Sunlight (2018)
 Onsitelover (2021)
 Learn to Say No (2021)

Personal life 
Toledano lives with Dalit Namirovsky and the two have a daughter named Aliyah.

References

External links 

1985 births
Academic staff of Ono Academic College
Israeli musicians
People from Tel Aviv
Living people